John Berkeley, 1st Baron Berkeley of Stratton (1602–1678) was an English royalist soldier, politician and diplomat.

John Berkeley may also refer to:
John Berkeley (1531–1582), MP for Hampshire 1566–1571
John Berkeley (died 1428) (1352–1428), MP for Hampshire, Gloucestershire, Somerset and Wiltshire
John Berkeley (died c.1415), MP for Leicestershire
John Symes Berkeley (1663–1736), member of parliament for the constituency of Gloucestershire
John Berkeley, 5th Baron Berkeley of Stratton (1697–1773), British politician
John Berkeley, 3rd Baron Berkeley of Stratton  (1663–1697), English admiral
John Berkeley, 4th Viscount Fitzhardinge (1650–1712), English courtier, treasury official, army officer and Member of Parliament

See also
John Barclay (disambiguation)